The Troublemaker (Spanish: La revoltosa) is a 1969 Spanish musical film directed by Juan de Orduña and starring José Sacristán, Antonio Durán and Elisa Ramírez. The film is based on the 1897 zarzuela of the same title by Carlos Fernández Shaw and José López Silva, and was the second adaptation made that decade following The Troublemaker in 1963. The film was made with the financial backing of Televisión Española.

Cast
 José Sacristán as Tiberio 
 Antonio Durán as Atenedoro  
 Manuel Fernández Aranda as Chupitos  
 Elisa Ramírez as Mari Pepa  
 Antonio Casal as Cándido  
 María Luisa Ponte as Gorgonia  
 José Moreno as Felipe  
 Antonio Martelo as Sr. Candelas  
 Mónica Randall as Encarna 
 Marisa Paredes as Soledad

References

Bibliography
 Bentley, Bernard. A Companion to Spanish Cinema. Boydell & Brewer 2008.

External links 

1969 films
Spanish musical films
1960s musical films
1960s Spanish-language films
Films directed by Juan de Orduña
1960s Spanish films